Bridge 10 over the Erie Canal and Mohawk River in Schenectady. Bridge 10 is a railroad bridge used by the Canadian Pacific Railway. The rails on the bridge were realigned as part of a clearance project in the late 1990s.  The double track was removed and replaced by a single set of rails in the center of the bridge.  This was to allow the passage of very large steam turbine parts to be moved by rail from Schenectady's General Electric to the Port of Albany.

Erie Canal Bridge 10
Bridge 10
Erie Canal Bridge 10
Steel bridges in the United States
Girder bridges in the United States
Truss bridges in the United States
Transportation buildings and structures in Schenectady County, New York